Tseng Chun-hsin was the defending champion, but participated at the men's singles qualifying as a wild card, who lost to Tommy Paul in the first round.

Shintaro Mochizuki won the title, defeating Carlos Gimeno Valero in the final, 6–3, 6–2.

Seeds

Draw

Finals

Top half

Section 1

Section 2

Bottom half

Section 3

Section 4

Qualifying

Seeds

Qualifiers

Lucky loser

Draw

First qualifier

Second qualifier

Third qualifier

Fourth qualifier

Fifth qualifier

Sixth qualifier

Seventh qualifier

Eighth qualifier

References

External links
 Draw

Boys' Singles
Wimbledon Championship by year – Boys' singles